Nama Japam or Nama Sankeertanam is the japa (repetition) or Sankirtana of nama (name) of the Almighty.  The devotee chooses Ishta-deva or Ishta devata (Sanskrit , literally "cherished divinity" from iṣṭa "desired, liked, cherished" and devatā "godhead, divinity," or deva "deity") and picks up a name of the Ishta deva to repeatedly chant the name vocally or in the mind any time, anywhere.  Devotees can form a group and do sankeertanam or singing together of name of the Almighty.

The trinities of Namasankeerthanam Bodhendra Saraswathi,Sridhara Venkatesa Ayyaval and MarudanallurSadguru Swamigal compiled the Bhajana Sampradaya. Namasankeerthanam also gained momentum through stalwarts such as Pudukottai Gopalakrishna Bhagavathar and Haridhos Giri who popularized it with adherence to paddathi(tradition).  
Gita Govinda,Tarangini (music),Abhang and Namavalis(Tempo) are few common genres. 
Devotional songs were sung by Mirabai,Surdas,Samarth Ramdas,Sant Eknath,Chokhamela,Purandara Dasa and several other saints. 
It is believed that Namasankeerthanam helps overcome the effects of Kali and karmic impressions in Kali Yuga. 
It is an inclusive form of Bhakti, agnostic to gender and caste differences.

Bhishma considered chanting of the Vishnu sahasranama the best and easiest of all dharmas, or the means to attain relief from all bondage.

Adi Sankaracharya, the Advaita enlightened master, in verse 27 of his hymn, Bhaja Govindam, said that the Gita and Vishnu sahasranama should be chanted and the form of the Lord of Lakshmi-Narayana should always be meditated on. He also said that the Sahasranama bestowed all noble virtues on those who chanted it.

See also
 Annamacharya sankeertana
 Ram Nam
 Bangla Kirtan

References

External links
 Significance of Nama Sankeertanam
 ISKCON
 Summary of Padma Purana

 

Hindu philosophical concepts
Bhakti movement
Meditation
Hindu practices
Kirtan

mr:स्वामी रामदास